MonaLisa Twins are a pop rock band, fronted by twin-sister singer-songwriters Mona Wagner (vocals, rhythm guitar, percussion, harmonica, flute) and Lisa Wagner (vocals, lead guitar, ukulele, cello).

Biography
The twins were born in Austria (born in Vienna, on June 16, 1994) and are based in Liverpool, in the United Kingdom. Known for their YouTube video covers of songs by The Beatles and other 1960s bands, many of which have been issued on a series of albums, they also have released three albums of original songs, inspired by the music of the 1960s. They have toured with Steve Harley & Cockney Rebel, performed at the Glastonbury Festival, collaborated with American musician John Sebastian, and held a two-year residency at the Cavern Club.

The band's producer is the twins' father, Rudolf Wagner, who also plays the bass and piano, and co-writes and arranges their music, which is recorded in the Wagner family's own music studio. Rudolf's wife and the twins' stepmother, Michaela Wagner, is the band's manager and assistant. The family lived in a small village in the Groß-Enzersdorf municipality near Vienna until 2014, when they moved to a suburb of Liverpool.

The band typically has a four-person line-up for live concerts, with Mona and Lisa Wagner mostly playing guitars, and some harmonica and ukulele, respectively, on stage, while being backed by different bassists and drummers. In 2012 and 2013, while they were still based in Austria, those musicians were usually Michael Mozeth (bass) and Philipp Wolf (drums). Since 2014, including the two-year residency at the Cavern Club, they have been backed by several local British musicians.

Musical style and development

Genres
The Twins started interpreting rock and roll hits from the 1960s and 1970s, including some folk songs. Throughout their career, they have created their original songs in the style of rock & roll and rock pop, but also ballads, paired with quality video clips. Both work symbiotically as a team in their audio and video recordings.

Influences
The MonaLisa Twins have been particularly influenced by the British band The Beatles. They are known for their covers of Beatles hits, but are also influenced and inspired by rock and pop from other artists and bands of the time. Their original music has also been primarily moved by rock and pop from the 1960s and 1970s, usually having the presence of an electric guitar in both their covers and original songs.

Discography

Albums
2007 - MonaLisa & Band, Live in Concert (double CD)
2012 - When We're Together (also DVD)
2014 - Play Beatles & More
2017 - Orange
2018 - Play Beatles & More Vol.2
2018 - Play Beatles & More Vol.3
2019 - Christmas
2020 - The Duo Sessions
2020 - Live at The Cavern Club (double CD)
2022 - Why?

EP
2008 - California Dreaming

References

External links
 Official website
 YouTube channel
 Russian Fan Club

1994 births
Living people
Austrian women musicians
Austrian pop rock music groups
Twin musical duos
Female musical duos
Austrian expatriates in England
Musical groups established in 2007